Business acumen, also known as business savviness, business sense and business understanding, is keenness and quickness in understanding and dealing with a business situation (risks and opportunities) in a manner that is likely to lead to a good outcome. Additionally, business acumen has emerged as a vehicle for improving financial performance and leadership development. Consequently, several different types of strategies have developed around improving business acumen.

Characteristics

Executive level thinking 
In his 2012 book, Seeing the Big Picture, Business Acumen to Build Your Credibility, Career, and Company, Kevin R. Cope put forward that an individual who possesses business acumen views the business with an "executive mentality" - they understand how the moving parts of a company work together to make it successful and how financial metrics like profit margin, cash flow, and stock price reflect how well each of those moving parts is doing its job. Cope proposes that an individual who has the following five abilities could be described as someone having a strong sense of business acumen: 
See the “big picture” of the organization—how the key drivers of the business relate to each other, work together to produce profitable growth, and relate to the job
Understand important company communications and data, including financial statements
Use knowledge to make good decisions
Understand how actions and decisions impact key company measures and leadership objectives 
Effectively communicate ideas to other employees, managers, executives, and the public

Distinguishing traits 

Raymond R. Reilly of the Ross School of Business at the University of Michigan and Gregory P. Reilly of the University of Connecticut document traits that individuals with business acumen possess: 
 An acute perception of the dimensions of business issues
 Ability to make sense out of complexity and an uncertain future
 Cognizance of the implications of a choice for all the affected parties
 Decisive
 Flexibility for further change if warranted in the future
Thus, developing stronger business acumen means a more thoughtful analysis, clearer logic underlying business decisions, closer attention to key dimensions of implementation and operation, and more disciplined performance management.

Financial literacy 

Financial literacy is a comprehensive understanding of the drivers of growth, profitability, and cash flow; an organization's financial statements; key performance measures; and the implications of decisions on value creation. In a SHRM article entitled, "Business Acumen Involves More Than Numbers" Chris Berger, member of human resources at CTPartners, explains that business acumen starts with the ability to understand how a company makes decisions, and that leaders must be financially literate and be able to understand numbers on company financial statements. It entails the ability to take the knowledge of business fundamentals and use it to think strategically and then take appropriate action.

According to E. Ted Prince, "Financial literacy is almost never the need for senior managers and high potentials. Most already possess degrees in business, including MBAs, and many have also had experience in the business sides of their professional roles. The need for these managers is to understand how their actions and their behavior impact their financial decision-making and how this in turn affects financial outcomes at the unit and the corporate level." It's evident that an individual with business acumen has some level of financial understanding and knowledge - but someone who is financially literate doesn't necessarily possess strong business acumen.

Business management and leadership 

Bob Selden, faculty member of Mobilizing People, a leadership development program based in Switzerland, observes a complementary relationship between business acumen and leadership. Selden states the importance of nurturing both the development of strategic skills and that of good leadership and management skills in order for business leaders to achieve effectiveness.

A study published in Human Resource Management International Digest titled, Business acumen: a critical concern of modern leadership development: Global trends accelerate the move away from traditional approaches, reveals why traditional leadership development approaches, which rely on personality and competency assessments as the scientific core of their approach, are failing. The paper demonstrates the importance of business acumen in leadership-development approaches and contends that business acumen will have an increasing impact on leadership development and HR agendas. Research into this relationship resulted in the creation of the Perth Leadership Outcome Model, which links financial outcomes to individual leadership traits.

In a study that interviewed 55 global business leaders, business acumen was cited as the most critical competency area for global leaders.

In their 2011 book, The Leadership Pipeline, Ram Charan, Stephen Drotter, and James Noel study the process and criteria for selecting a group manager, and suggest that the process and criteria are similar for selecting a CEO. According to them an obvious criterium for selecting a leader is well-developed business acumen.

An organization full of high business acumen individuals can expect to see leaders with a heightened perspective that translates into an ability to inspire and excite the organization to achieve its potential.

Development
Programs designed to improve an individual or group's business acumen have supported the recognition of the concept as a significant topic in the corporate world. Executive Development Associates' 2009/2010 survey of Chief Learning Officers, Senior Vice Presidents of Human Resources, and Heads of Executive and Leadership Development listed business acumen as the second most significant trend in executive development. A 2011 report explores the impact of business acumen training on an organization in terms of intangibles and more tangible expressions of value. The findings support the notion that business acumen is a learned skill - developed on the job by learning the required skills from knowledge mentors while working in different employment positions. They also suggest that the learning process ranges widely, from structured internal company training programs, to an individual's self-chosen moves from one position to another.

The combination of these reports and surveys indicate that business acumen is a learned skill of increasing importance within the corporate world. There are different types of business acumen development programs available:

Business simulations 

A business simulation is another corporate development tool used to increase business acumen. Several companies offer business simulations as a way to educate mid-level managers and non-financial leaders within their organization on cash flow and financial-decision-making processes. Their forms can vary from computer simulations to boardgame-style simulations.

Psychological assessments 

The advent of personal assessments for business acumen is based in the emerging theories of behavioral finance and attempts to correlate innate personality traits with positive financial outcomes. This method approaches business acumen not as entirely based in either knowledge or experience, but on the combination of these and other factors which comprise an individual's financial personality or "signature". The results from this research have been limited, but noteworthy.

References 

Management
Trade